Sejersted, Seyersted or Seierstad may refer to:

People

Sejersted
 Johannes Klingenberg Sejersted (1761–1823) Lieutenant General Nordenfjells
 Per Seyersted (1921–2005), professor
 Ernst Sejersted Selmer (1920–2006) and Knut Sejersted Selmer (1924–2009), professor brothers
 Francis Sejersted (1936–2015) historian and his son Fredrik Sejersted (1965–) law professor, government lawyer
 Lotte Smiseth Sejersted (1991–) and Adrian Smiseth Sejersted (1994–), Alpine siblings

Seierstad
 Åsne Seierstad (1970–), writer
 Hans Seierstad (1951–) runs the farm Østre Seierstad on Østre Toten and is the mayor

Other
Seierstad, Norway, a farm in Fosnes municipality, Trøndelag county, Norway